Thomas John Mitchell Ashley  (born 11 February 1984 in Auckland) is a sailor from New Zealand, who won the gold medal in the men's sailboard event at the 2008 Summer Olympics, he also won the 2008 RS:X World Championships. He is the Olympic champion and the 2008 World champion. Ashley attended Westlake Boys High School in Auckland, which had earlier fostered the development of other notable sailors, including Chris Dickson and Dean Barker.

Ashley placed 2nd two years previous at the 2006 World Championships. During the event the top-10 sailors were selected to sail the final race, called the medal race. Before the start of the medal race Ashley was in first position, only one point in front of Casper Bouman from the Netherlands. Bouman finished second in the medal race, one position in front of Ashley. Both sailors then had the same points (23), but Bouman was crowned as the World champion thanks to his better position during the medal race.

In the 2009 New Year Honours, Ashley was appointed an Officer of the New Zealand Order of Merit, for services to board sailing.

Achievements

Club memberships
Ashley is a member of:
Takapuna Boating Club http://www.takapunaboating.org.nz
The Devonport Pony Club http://www.devonportponyclub.co.nz
The New Zealand RSX Association http://www.yachtingnz.org.nz

References

External links
 
 
 
 

1984 births
Living people
New Zealand windsurfers
Officers of the New Zealand Order of Merit
New Zealand male sailors (sport)
Olympic gold medalists for New Zealand in sailing
Sportspeople from Auckland
Sailors at the 2004 Summer Olympics – Mistral One Design
Sailors at the 2008 Summer Olympics – RS:X
People educated at Westlake Boys High School
Medalists at the 2008 Summer Olympics
RS:X class world champions